Denzel Jeremiah Mims (born October 10, 1997) is an American football wide receiver for the New York Jets of the National Football League (NFL). He played college football at Baylor.

Early years
Mims attended Daingerfield High School in Daingerfield, Texas. He played wide receiver and safety. He committed to Baylor University to play college football. Mims also ran track and played basketball in high school.

College career
Mims played in 11 games as a true freshman at Baylor in 2016 and had four receptions for 24 yards. He became a starter his sophomore year in 2017. He started 11 of 12 games, finishing with 61 receptions for 1,087 yards and eight touchdowns. As a junior in 2018 he started 10 of 12 games, recording 55 receptions for 794 yards and eight touchdowns. Mims returned for his senior year in 2019 and started all 13 games for Baylor, recording 66 receptions for 1,020 yards and 12 touchdowns.  The final game of his collegiate career was the 2020 Sugar Bowl, which featured two 11–2 teams in the Baylor Bears and the Georgia Bulldogs.  In that game, Mims led the Baylor offense in receiving yards, finishing with five receptions for 75 yards, and scoring the team's lone receiving touchdown.  Georgia defeated Baylor with a final score of 26–14.

Professional career

Mims was drafted by the New York Jets in the second round of the 2020 NFL Draft as the 59th overall pick. After missing most of training camp due to a hamstring injury, he was placed on injured reserve on September 15, 2020. He was activated on October 24 and made his NFL debut in Week 7 against the Buffalo Bills and had four receptions for 42 receiving yards. He missed the team's week 14 game due to a personal issue, and returned to the team after the game.

References

External links
New York Jets bio
Baylor Bears bio

1997 births
Living people
People from Daingerfield, Texas
Players of American football from Texas
American football wide receivers
Baylor Bears football players
New York Jets players